Carlos Álvarez-Nóvoa Sánchez (1940 in La Felguera – 23 September 2015) was a Spanish theatre director, writer, actor and lecturer. He won the 2000 Goya award for Best New Actor for his performance as Vecino in Solas.
He died on 23 September 2015 from lung cancer at the age of 75.

Selected filmography

References

External links

1940 births
2015 deaths
Spanish male film actors
Spanish theatre directors
Spanish male writers
Spanish educators
People from Asturias
Deaths from lung cancer in Spain
20th-century Spanish male actors
21st-century Spanish male actors